Gaziura, was a town in Pontus, on the river Iris, near the point where its course turns northwards. Some scholars equate Gaziura with Talaura, others with Ibora, and others with modern Turhal.

It was the ancient residence of the kings of Pontus, but in Strabo's time it was deserted. (Strab. xii.) Dion Cassius (xxxv. 12) notices it as a place where Mithridates VI of Pontus took up his position against the Roman Triarius. (Comp. Pliny vi. 2.)

References

Hellenistic Pontus
Ancient Greek archaeological sites in Turkey
Roman towns and cities in Turkey
Former populated places in Turkey
History of Tokat Province
Populated places in ancient Pontus